Andrei Tivontchik (born 13 July 1970, in Gorkiy) is a former German pole vaulter. He was Olympic bronze medalist at the 1996 Summer Olympics in Atlanta.

Tivontchik grew up in the Soviet Union and became a Belarusian citizen after the Soviet dissolution. In 1993 he moved to Germany and became a German citizen. Beginning with the 1994 European Championships he started for the German team. Tivontchik could not take part in the 2000 Olympics and retired in 2001.

His personal best is 5.95 metres, achieved in 1996.

After working as trainer of the national pole vault team of Qatar, Tivontchik returned to Germany in 2004 where he is working as a trainer at LAZ Zweibrücken.

See also
 Germany all-time top lists - Pole vault

References

1970 births
Living people
German male pole vaulters
Belarusian male pole vaulters
German athletics coaches
Olympic athletes of Germany
Olympic bronze medalists for Germany
Athletes (track and field) at the 1996 Summer Olympics
World Athletics Championships athletes for Germany
German people of Belarusian descent
Medalists at the 1996 Summer Olympics
Olympic bronze medalists in athletics (track and field)